Huaqiao University (Acronym: HQU) is a national university located in Xiamen and Quanzhou, Fujian province, China.

Huaqiao University was founded in 1960, with support from the late Chinese premier and historical figure Zhou Enlai, for students of overseas Chinese backgrounds (Hong Kong, Taiwan, Macau, Singapore) to pursue tertiary education in their ancestral homelands. The university has two campuses in the cities of Xiamen and Quanzhou, known for their large numbers of overseas Chinese students who have roots in these cities.

University History
Since its founding, the university has graduated more than 76,000 students, of which 36,000 are from overseas. The university has 28,000 full-time on-campus students, including 3,000 overseas students from 29 countries and regions including Taiwan, Hong Kong, Macau, Malaysia, the Philippines, Indonesia, Thailand, Japan, United States and Argentina.

The university won the last three national Challenge Cup contest. Students competed in many areas such as academic, scientific and the technology field. The university won 10 prizes and the group scores were in the 13th, 16th, and 10th places respectively, which ranked the first among the universities and colleges in Fujian province.

The men's basketball team of the university won the national championship in the 2nd, 5th, 7th, 8th, 9th, 10th and 13th and runner-up in the 4th CUBA (China University Basketball Association) tournaments.

Infrastructure

Quanzhou Campus

The main campus covers an area of 740,000 m2with a total floor space of 550,000 square metres.

Xiamen Campus

The new campus in Xiamen covering 1,320,000m2 is currently in use. The library has a total collection of 2,040,000 volumes of 1,030,000 titles.

Chinese Language and Culture College

Chinese Language and Culture College is subordinate to Huaqiao University, which used to be Remedial School of Jimei's overseas students (Jimei Chinese Language School), a special school to provide overseas students with Chinese language and cultural knowledge. There are already 320,000 graduates from over 30 countries and areas. Chinese Language and Culture College is the base of the national Chinese education, and the only place for HSK in Fujian Province instituted by the nation's HSK committee. There are the short-term Chinese study course, training course of the Chinese teachers, overseas students’ summer/winter camp, the symposium of the Chinese culture and the preparatory course for the overseas Chinese and the youth students from Hong Kong, Macau, and Taiwan. It currently has more than 700 postgraduates.

Faculty
The university has more than 1,700 faculty members, with over 500 holding senior professional titles. There are 900 full-time teachers, 400 professors and associate professors, over 141 PhD degrees holders and 38 government funded researchers.

Faculties and departments
The university comprises 19 colleges or departments of science, engineering, economics, management, law, liberal arts, philosophy, and history. It offers 9 PhD programs, 64 masters programs, 6 engineering masters programs, 52 undergraduate programs, with 11 provincial or ministerial key disciplines.

Courses
Since 1997, the university has enrolled a total of 216 postgraduates from Macau, who pursued such fields as economy, enterprise management, computer science and philosophy.  The university has also offered Master's degrees to a total of 30 students from Macau in 2002.

Rankings 

In 2020, Academic Ranking of World Universities ranked Huaqiao university within the 901-1000 band globally.

References

External links
 www.hqu.edu.cn/ 
 en.hqu.edu.cn/ official website 

 
Educational institutions established in 1960
Universities and colleges in Fujian
1960 establishments in China